Hennric David Yeboah (1957 – 1 March 2019) was a businessman  and Ghanaian politician of the Republic of Ghana. He was the Member of Parliament representing Afigya Sekyere East constituency of the Ashanti Region of Ghana in the 4th, 5th, and 6th Parliament of the 4th Republic of Ghana. He was a member of the New Patriotic Party.

Early life and education 
Yeboah was born on 11 March 1957. He hailed from Agona, a town in the Ashanti Region of Ghana.  He studied at Malcolm X College in Chicago, Illinois. He received a diploma in 1986 from the said college.

Career 
Yeboah was a businessman and was the CEO of Daphelia Enterprise Limited at Spintex road in Accra, Ghana.

Political career 
Yeboah was  a member of the New Patriotic Party. He first entered into parliament in 2004 and was the member of parliament for Afigya Sekyere East Constituency in Ashanti region of Ghana. He run for two more terms in the 5th and 6th Parliament of the 4th Republic.  In 2015, he lost the New Patriotic Party primaries to Mavis Nkansah Boadu.

Elections 
Yeboah was elected as the member of parliament for the  Afigya Sekyere East constituency of the Ashanti Region of Ghana for the first time in the 2004 Ghanaian general elections. He won on the ticket of the New Patriotic Party. His constituency was a part of the 36 parliamentary seats out of 39 seats won by the New Patriotic Party in that election for the Ashanti Region. The New Patriotic Party won a majority total of 128 parliamentary seats out of 230 seats.  He was elected with 32,143 votes out of 41,220 total valid votes cast equivalent to 78% of total valid votes cast. He was elected over Edward Kusi Ayarkwah of the National Democratic Congress, Adamu Alhassan of the Convention People's Party and Alhaji Amidu Adam of the Democratic People's Party. These obtained 20.5%, 1% and 0.60% respectively of total valid votes cast.

In 2008, he won the general elections on the ticket of the New Patriotic Party for the same constituency. His constituency was part of the 34 parliamentary seats out of 39 seats won by the New Patriotic Party in that election for the Ashanti Region. The New Patriotic Party won a minority total of 109 parliamentary seats out of 230 seats. He was elected with 33,080 votes out of 43,505 total valid votes cast equivalent to 76.04% of total valid votes cast. He was elected over Edward Ayarkwah of the National Democratic Congress, Osman Isshak of the People's National Convention, Amidu Alhaji Adam of the Democratic People's Party and Obeng Nyantakyi Clement of the Convention People's Party. These obtained 21.61%, 0.59%, 0.29% and 1.47% respectively of the total votes cast.

Personal life 
Yeboah was a Christian. He was a member of a Charismatic Christian Church. He was married with five children.

Death 
Yeboah died on 1 March 2019, at the age of 62 whilst receiving treatment at the Komfo Anokye Teaching Hospital in Kumasi.

See also
List of MPs elected in the 2004 Ghanaian parliamentary election
List of MPs elected in the 2008 Ghanaian parliamentary election
List of MPs elected in the 2012 Ghanaian parliamentary election

References

1957 births
2019 deaths
Ghanaian MPs 2005–2009
Ghanaian MPs 2009–2013
Ghanaian MPs 2013–2017
Ghanaian businesspeople
New Patriotic Party politicians
Ghanaian Christians